The 2018–19 Ford Trophy was the 48th season of The Ford Trophy, the List A cricket tournament in New Zealand. It was the eighth in a sponsorship deal between New Zealand Cricket and Ford Motor Company. Originally scheduled to take place between December 2018 and February 2019, it was brought forward, starting on 24 October and finished on 1 December 2018. Unlike the previous edition of the competition, the tournament featured ten rounds of matches, instead of eight. Auckland were the defending champions.

On 7 November 2018, in the fifth round fixture between Northern Districts and Central Districts, a new record in List A cricket was set for the most runs scored off one over, with 43. Northern Districts' batsmen Joe Carter and Brett Hampton scored the runs from the bowling of Willem Ludick. The over included two no-balls, six sixes, a four and a single.

Following the conclusion of the group stage, Otago finished top of the table, and progressed directly to the final of the tournament. Wellington and Auckland finished second and third respectively, progressing to the elimination final. In the elimination match, Wellington beat Auckland by three wickets, with James Neesham scoring 120 not out. In the final, Wellington beat Otago by three wickets to win their eighth title.

Points table

 Teams qualified for the finals

Fixtures

Round 1

Round 2

Round 3

Round 4

Round 5

Round 6

Round 7

Round 8

Round 9

Round 10

Finals

References

External links
 Series home at ESPN Cricinfo

Ford Trophy
2018–19 New Zealand cricket season
Ford Trophy